Acoustic Masters II is an album by vibraphonist Bobby Hutcherson, saxophonist Craig Handy, drummer Lenny White and trumpeter Jerry González featuring performances recorded in 1993 and released the following year on the Atlantic label.

Reception

On Allmusic, Scott Yanow observed "An all-star group was gathered together during a short-time revival of the Atlantic label's interest in jazz. ... The music falls between hard bop and post-bop, clearly inspiring and challenging the players even though none of the songs eventually became standards. Well worth searching for".

Track listing
 "8/4 Beat" (Bobby Hutcherson) – 5:22
 "Concrete Blues" (Craig Handy) – 8:25
 "Pablo" (Jane Getter, Lenny White) – 7:33
 "Little Waltz" (Ron Carter) – 5:32
 "Wayne's World" (Handy) – 6:16
 "Second Thoughts" (Mulgrew Miller) – 5:13
 "I Don't Know Why" (White) – 5:30
 "Stumblin'" (White) – 3:10
 "When I Fall in Love" (Victor Young, Edward Heyman) – 4:52

Personnel
Bobby Hutcherson – vibraphone
Craig Handy – tenor saxophone, soprano saxophone, flute
Lenny White – drums
Jerry González – trumpet, flugelhorn
Mulgrew Miller - piano
Ron Carter – bass

References

Atlantic Records albums
Bobby Hutcherson albums
1994 albums